The 2021 Norfolk County Council election took place alongside the other 2021 local elections. 83 of the 84 seats to Norfolk County Council were elected. One seat, Sewell in Norwich, had its election delayed to June 17 after Eve Collishaw, the Conservative candidate, died during the election campaign

The Conservative Party retained control of the council and increased its majority, winning 58 seats with around the same vote share as in the 2017 election: the Liberal Democrats lost three seats in the north of the county, and Labour took losses to the Conservatives in the port towns of King's Lynn and Great Yarmouth as well as three losses to the Green Party who regained ground in southern and central Norwich.

Summary

2017 election

Composition of council seats before election

Changes between elections

In between the 2017 election and the 2021 election, the following council seats changed hands:

Election result

|-

Results by Division

Breckland

Division results

Broadland

Division results

Great Yarmouth

Division results

King's Lynn and West Norfolk

Division results

North Norfolk

Norwich

Division results

 

 

 

 

 

 

 

 

Due to the death of Evelyn Collishaw, the Conservative candidate, after the close of nominations, the election for Sewell division was delayed until 17 July.

South Norfolk

Division results

By-elections

Gaywood South

Gaywood North and Central

References 

Norfolk County Council elections
2021 English local elections
2020s in Norfolk